Nedžad Fazlagić (born 30 November 1974) is a Bosnian retired international footballer.

International career
He made his debut in Bosnia and Herzegovina's first ever official international game, a November 1995 friendly match away against Albania. It remained his sole official international appearance. He had earlier played in an unofficial game against Iran, in September 1993, in which the team was entirely made up of FK Sarajevo players.

References

External links

1974 births
Living people
Footballers from Sarajevo
Association football midfielders
Bosnia and Herzegovina footballers
Bosnia and Herzegovina international footballers
FK Sarajevo players
Premier League of Bosnia and Herzegovina players